Hiroko Yoda is a Japanese entrepreneur, translator, writer, folklorist, and president of the localization company AltJapan Co., Ltd. She was also a Tokyo city editor for the CNN travel website CNNGo. She is a translator of video games and the author of numerous books about Japanese history and culture. She is particularly known for her pioneering work contextualizing yokai culture for English-speaking audiences.

Education
Born in Tokyo, she studied at the University of Maryland, then earned a Master's degree in International Peace and Conflict Resolution from American University in Washington, D.C.

Personal life
In 2005, she played the role of a yokai frog in the Takashi Miike film The Great Yokai War. She also had a cameo in the 2010 Tomoo Haraguchi film Death Kappa.

In 2008, she was denied a Facebook account. She was told that "Facebook blocks the registration of a number of names that are frequently abused on the site. The name Yoda, also being the name of a popular Star Wars character, is on this list of blocked names." The company only relented after her plight gained international mass media attention alongside other cases of banned names.

She is married to the writer and television personality Matt Alt.

Works

Games
As scriptwriter
 World of Demons
Ninja Gaiden Sigma 2
Ninja Gaiden Dragon Sword

As translator
Silhouette Mirage
Lunar: Silver Star Story
Dragon Quest VIII
Ninja Gaiden II
The Wonderful 101
Nioh

As localization producer
Dynasty Warriors Gundam
Lost Planet 3
Strider (2014)

Books

Translations
Books

Manga

References 

Japanese women chief executives
21st-century Japanese businesspeople
Japanese video game businesspeople
21st-century Japanese translators
Living people
Women folklorists
21st-century Japanese women writers
Japanese folklorists
CNN people
 Japanologists
 Video game localization
Japanese women journalists
Businesspeople from Tokyo
American University School of International Service alumni
Year of birth missing (living people)